The Hall County School District is a public school district in Hall County, Georgia, United States, based in Gainesville. It serves the communities of Braselton, Clermont, Flowery Branch, Gillsville, Lula, Oakwood, and Rest Haven. It also serves the Hall County portion of Buford, as well as slivers of Gainesville and most of Hall County's unincorporated area.

The Superintendent is Will Schofield. The chair of the Hall County Board of Education is Nath Morris, who also serves as the North Hall Representative. The four other  board members are Craig Herrington, Vice-chairman and West Hall Representative; Sam Chapman, East Hall Representative; Bill Thompson, County At-Large Representative; and Mark Pettitt, South Hall Representative.

In October 2009, Hall County Schools received accreditation from the Southern Association of Colleges and Schools with a grade of A.

Board of Education and Administration

Board of Education
The school district is governed by the Board of Education. The Board is made up of five members elected by all Hall County citizens. The current Board Members are

The Board holds open meetings twice a month to vote on educational matters, recognize students and teachers, and get input from the community.

Schools
The Hall County School District has twenty elementary schools, seven traditional middle schools, and seven traditional high schools.

Elementary schools
Chestnut Mountain Elementary School
Chicopee Elementary School
Flowery Branch Elementary School
Friendship Elementary School
Lanier Elementary School
Lula Elementary School
Lyman Hall Elementary School
Martin Elementary School
McEver Elementary School
Mount Vernon Elementary School
Myers Elementary School
Oakwood Elementary School
Riverbend Elementary School
Sardis Elementary School
Spout Springs Elementary School
Sugar Hill Elementary School
Tadmore Elementary School
Wauka Mountain Elementary School
White Sulphur Elementary School
World Language Academy

Middle schools
Alternative Learning Center
C. W. Davis Middle School
Cherokee Bluff Middle School
Chestatee Middle School
East Hall Middle School
North Hall Middle School
South Hall Middle School
West Hall Middle School
World Language Academy

High schools
Alternative Learning Center
Cherokee Bluff High School
Chestatee High School
Early College at Jones
East Hall High School
Flowery Branch High School
Johnson High School
Lanier Career Academy
North Hall High School
West Hall High School

References

External links

Education in Hall County, Georgia
School districts in Georgia (U.S. state)